Hemington may refer to:

Hemington, Leicestershire
Hemington, Northamptonshire
Hemington, Somerset